Bill Lucas (born 13 September 1987 in Exeter) is a British rower. He competed with Sam Townsend in the double sculls at the 2012 Summer Olympics and finished fifth. He attended Towerhouse School for primary school education and Torquay Boys Grammar school for secondary education.

References

External links 
 

1987 births
Living people
English male rowers
Sportspeople from Exeter
Rowers at the 2012 Summer Olympics
Olympic rowers of Great Britain